Jellinbah is a rural locality in the Central Highlands Region, Queensland, Australia. Jellinbah coal mine is in the locality.

References 

Central Highlands Region
Localities in Queensland